The Skardu District is a district of Gilgit-Baltistan territory of Pakistan. The Skardu District is bounded on the east by the Ghanche District, on the south by the Kharmang District, on the west by the Astore District, on the north-west by the Rondu District and on the north by the Shigar district.  The district headquarters is the town of Skardu, which is also the division headquarters.

Mountain peaks and glaciers

The highest peak in the Skardu District is K2 (8,611 m), which is the highest peak in Pakistan and its two dependent territories and is the second-highest peak in the world. The Baltoro Muztagh, the subrange of the Karakoram Mountains that includes the mighty peaks of K2 (8,611 m), Broad Peak (8,047 m), the Gasherbrums (8,000+ m), and Masherbrum (7,821 m), is located in the Skardu District. Askole is the last settlement in the district for all treks to Concordia (the confluence of the Baltoro Glacier and the Godwin-Austen Glacier). The Biafo Glacier and a major part of the Hispar Glacier are also located in the Skardu District.

Education

According to the Alif Ailaan Pakistan District Education Rankings 2015, the Skardu District is ranked 14th out of 148 districts in terms of education. For facilities and infrastructure, the district is ranked 89th out of 148 districts.

Deosai National Park

The Deosai Plateau is one of the highest plateaus in the world.
Skardu District shares the area of the Deosai National Park including Small Deosai, part of Gultari Skardu, and others with Astore District, which has a major portion.  The Deosai Plateau is the second- highest plateau in the world, after the Tibet Plateau.

Major towns

The major towns of Skardu District are:- Arandu, Haji Gham, Sakwar and Skardu itself.

Demography

People of the Skardu District are predominantly of the Shia sect of Islam, where 97% of the people are of the Shia sect, 2% are of the Noorbakshi sect, and 1% are of the Sunni sect.

Lakes

The main lakes in the district are:

 Kachura Lake
 Satpara Lake
 Shangrila Lake
 Sheosar Lake
 Snow Lake

Mountain passes

The Gondogoro Pass is located in the Skardu District.

See also

Geography of Gilgit–Baltistan

References

External links

 Skardu on Wikivoyage